Jerzy Bińczycki (6 September 1937 – 2 October 1998) was a Polish stage and film actor. He appeared in 50 films between 1962 and 1998. He starred in the 1975 film Nights and Days, which was entered into the 26th Berlin International Film Festival.

Bińczycki was awarded the Officer's Cross of the Order of Polonia Restituta in 1989. He is buried at the Rakowicki Cemetery in Kraków.

Partial filmography

 Drugi brzeg (1962)
 Koniec naszego swiata (1964) - Zyd na rampie
 Pięciu (1964) - Coalminer (uncredited)
 Goraca linia (1965)
 Skok (1969)
 Salt of the Black Earth (1970) - Bernard Basista
 Poludnik zero (1971) - Byk
 Family Life (1971)
 Szklana kula (1972) - Tourist
 Janosik (1974) - Straznik (uncredited)
 Orzel i reszka (1975) - Doctor
 Nights and Days (1975) - Bogumil Niechcic
 Dagny (1977) - Jan Kasprowicz
 Szpital Przemienienia (1979) - Engineer Andrzej Nowacki
 Podróz do Arabii (1980) - Dr. Andrzej
 W bialy dzien (1981) - Radca
 Ciosy (1981)
 Anna (1981) - Kozma
 Dreszcze (1981) - Cebula, nauczyciel jezyka polskiego
 The Quack (1982) - Prof. Rafał Wilczur
 Okno (1983) - Neighbour
 Na odsiecz Wiedniowi (1983) - Jan III Sobieski
 Okolice spokojnego morza (1983) - Cpt. Piotr Ziemba
 Diary for My Lovers (1987) - Professzor
 Magnat (1987) - Zbierski, Director of von Teusses' Mines
 Cienie (1988) - Józef
 Meskie sprawy (1989)
 Pilkarski poker (1989) - Football Association Official
 Powroty (1989) - Doktor Majeran
 Escape from the 'Liberty' Cinema (1990) - Cinema Manager Karwanski
 30 Door Key (1991) - Prof. Filidor
 Listopad (1992) - Sara's father
 Superwizja (1993) - Ryszard Edman - chairman of 'SuperVision'
 Enak (1993) - Known Reporter
 Panna z mokra glowa (1994)
 Legenda Tatr (1995)
 Dzieje mistrza Twardowskiego (1996) - Professor Lukasz
 A hetedik szoba (1996) - University rector
 O dwóch takich, co nic nie ukradli (1999) - Professor
 Pan Tadeusz (1999) - Maciej Królik-Rózeczka
 Syzyfowe prace (2000) - Priest Wargulski

References

External links
 

1937 births
1998 deaths
Male actors from Kraków
Polish male film actors
Polish male stage actors
Officers of the Order of Polonia Restituta
20th-century Polish male actors